The EMD GA8 was an export diesel locomotive designed by GM-EMD in the late 1950s as a simplified design for use on overseas railways with light rail and sharp curves. 
At the time of its introduction it was described as an extremely lightweight road locomotive capable of handling passenger or freight trains and switching.
The locomotive is notable for its use of freight car trucks that are driven by cardan shafts and two traction motors attached to the underframe. Measuring 32 feet 6 inches, they are equipped with an 8-567C prime mover capable of producing 875 bhp or 800 hp traction. Late model GA8 locomotives were equipped with an 8-567E prime mover which is a 645 block (introduced in 1965) fitted with 567 power assemblies. Due to the design, most servicing and maintenance could be done without removing the traction motors from the underframe or trucks of the locomotive.
The units were built without multiple unit connection capability so electrical components are kept to a minimum.

The EMD GL8 was a derivative design introduced in 1960 that is similar to the GA8 but used standard B-B or A1A-A1A trucks and was equipped with multiple unit capability.
The EMD GA8 prototype demonstrator unit was built in late 1958 or early 1959  and export customer production commenced in 1960. The GA8 demonstrator also attracted considerable attention from several US railroads, although ultimately none would ever purchase the locomotive for domestic use.
Several countries purchased the locomotive and examples are still in operation today.

Original Owners

Argentina
 
15   Sarmiento Railway 5551-5565. The 5554 and 5561 locomotive, receive change gauge and transferred to the Urquiza line.

Chile

3    Antofagasta y Bolivia  950-952

Colombia

2    National Railways of Colombia  501-502

El Salvador

16  International Railways of Central America, El Salvador Division, later Ferrocarriles Nacionales de El Salvador (National Railways of El Salvador) 851-866

Mexico

22   Coahuila y Zacatecas  800-802;  NdeM 5400-5416;  Unidos de Yucatán  204-205

Peru

3    Cerro de Pasco 21-23

South Africa

4  Anglo-American Corp. 1-2; Union Lime  1-2

South Korea

2    Fluor Corp. (No #);  Korean Oil  3

Taiwan

21   Taiwan Railway Administration  S301-S321

United States

 1  Electro-Motive Division demonstrator

Zambia

 5   Nchanga Consol Copper   8-12

Gallery

References

External links
 
 GA8 Photo
  EMD GA8 demonstrator

G08A
Standard gauge railway locomotives
Diesel-electric locomotives of Argentina
Diesel-electric locomotives of Chile
Diesel-electric locomotives of Mexico
Diesel-electric locomotives of Peru
Diesel-electric locomotives of South Africa
Diesel-electric locomotives of South Korea
Diesel-electric locomotives of Taiwan
Diesel-electric locomotives of Zambia